In thermodynamics, a mechanically isolated system is a system that is mechanically constraint to disallow deformations, so that it cannot perform any work on its environment. It may however, exchange heat across the system boundary.

For a simple system, mechanical isolation is equivalent to a state of constant volume and any process which occurs in such a simple system is said to be isochoric. 

The opposite of a mechanically isolated system is a mechanically open system, which allows the transfer of mechanical energy. For a simple system, a mechanically open boundary is one that is allowed to move under pressure differences between the two sides of the boundary. At mechanical equilibrium, the pressures on both sides of a mechanically open boundary are equal, but only a mechanically isolating boundary can support pressure differences.

See also
 Closed system
 Thermally isolated system
 Dynamical system
 Open system
 Thermodynamic system
 Isolated system

References

Thermodynamic systems